Ziroobwe is a town in Luweero District in the Central Region of Uganda. The correct phonetic spelling in the native Luganda language is "Ziroobwe".

Location
The coordinates of the town are 0°40'59.0"N, 32°42'04.0"E (Latitude:0.683056; Longitude:32.701111).

Population
In August 2012, the night-time population of the town was estimated at 5,000, swelling to an estimated 7,000 during working days.

Points of interest
The following additional points of interest are found in or near the town of Ziroobwe: The town hosts (a) the headquarters of Ziroobwe sub-county, an administrative until in Luweero District (b) Ziroobwe Central Market and (c) the offices of Ziroobwe Town Council.

The Gayaza–Ziroobwe Road, ends here. This  road connects Gayaza in Wakiso District to Ziroobwe in Luweero District.

See also
 List of universities in Uganda
 List of cities and towns in Uganda

References

Populated places in Central Region, Uganda
Cities in the Great Rift Valley
Luweero District